Ifjabb Ocskay Gábor Ice Hall is an indoor sporting arena in Székesfehérvár, Hungary.  The arena has a capacity of 3,500 people and was opened in 1991.  It is home to the Fehérvár AV19 ice hockey team, who play in the Austrian Hockey League. The hall is named after Alba Volán's legendary player, Gábor Ocskay, who died in 2009.

References

External links
Venue information and pictures

Indoor ice hockey venues in Hungary
Indoor arenas in Hungary
Buildings and structures in Székesfehérvár
Buildings and structures in Fejér County